Col du Lautaret is a high mountain pass in the department of Hautes-Alpes in France.

It marks the boundary between the valleys of the Romanche and the Guisane, a tributary of the Durance which has its source at the col. The valleys are linked by national route 91 (Grenoble – Le Bourg-d'Oisans – Briançon). The Lautaret is one of the lowest points on the ridge line which separates the "north" (mainly in the Rhône-Alpes région) and "south" (mainly in the Provence-Alpes-Côte d'Azur région) geographic areas of the French Alps.

The Col has long been used as a communication route between Grenoble and Briançon, and as a step for reaching Italy across the Alps through the Col de Montgenèvre.

The Col is open all year round and provides good views of La Meije to the south-west and the Grand Galibier to the north. It is also well known for its botanical garden managed by the Université Grenoble Alpes. The route to the south side of the Col du Galibier leaves from the Lautaret.

Cycle racing

Details of the climbs

Tour de France 
The Tour de France first crossed over the Col du Lautaret  in 1911, when the leader over the summit was Émile Georget. Since 1947, the Lautaret pass has been crossed over 40 times by the Tour de France, although most of these have not been classified for the "King of the Mountains" competition, usually when the pass is crossed on the descent from the Col du Galibier.

Appearances in Tour de France 
Since 1947, the passages which have been categorized have been:

See also
 Souvenir Henri Desgrange

References

External links 

Col du Lautaret on Google Maps (Tour de France classic climbs)

Mountain passes of the Alps
Mountain passes of Provence-Alpes-Côte d'Azur
Landforms of Hautes-Alpes
Transport in Provence-Alpes-Côte d'Azur
Provence-Alpes-Côte d'Azur region articles needing translation from French Wikipedia